The trefoil thick-horned tinea or large clover case-bearer (Coleophora trifolii) is a moth of the family Coleophoridae. It is found in Europe, North Africa, Asia Minor, Afghanistan and North America.

The wingspan is 15–20 mm. The forewings have a green metallic sheen. Adults are on wing from June to July. They are active during the day.

The larvae feed from July to September on the seeds of Melilotus species (including Melilotus albus, Melilotus officinalis and Melilotus altissima). They enter diapause in nearby vegetation and pupate the following spring in the case.

References

External links

trifolii
Moths described in 1832
Moths of Africa
Moths of Asia
Moths of Europe
Moths of North America
Taxa named by John Curtis